William George Amor (6 November 1919 – 1 May 1988) was an English amateur footballer who represented Great Britain at the 1948 Summer Olympics, making one appearance. Although he spent the majority of his career in non-league football with teams such as Huntley & Palmers and Metropolitan Police, Amor made 66 appearances in the Football League for Reading between 1947 and 1952.

References

1919 births
1988 deaths
English footballers
Reading F.C. players
Footballers at the 1948 Summer Olympics
Metropolitan Police F.C. players
English Football League players
Association football midfielders